Irma Hunter Brown is an American politician. She was a member of the Arkansas House of Representatives from 1981 to 1998, and a member of the Arkansas Senate from 2003 to 2008. She was the first African American woman to be an Arkansas legislator. Her photograph was included in a composite with other House members.

References

Members of the Arkansas House of Representatives
Arkansas state senators
Women state legislators in Arkansas
African-American state legislators in Arkansas
African-American women in politics
Living people
Year of birth missing (living people)
21st-century African-American people
21st-century African-American women